Wesley Silcox (born May 30, 1985) is an American former professional rodeo cowboy who specialized in bull riding. He competed in the Professional Rodeo Cowboys Association (PRCA) circuit and was the 2007 PRCA World Champion bull rider. He also competed in the now-defunct Championship Bull Riding (CBR) organization.

Background 
Wesley Silcox was born on May 30, 1985, in Payson, Utah. His first contact with rodeo was with team roping and tie-down roping. It wasn't until he attended Payson (Utah) High School that he tried bull riding. His father was a retired bull rider. He watched DVDs to help learn the sport. At Utah State High School, he won their rodeo association bull riding title. Then he qualified for the National High School Rodeo Association finals and placed fourth. He attended Utah Valley State College (West Orem).

Career 
Silcox joined the PRCA in 2004. In his rookie season, he finished 30th in the World Standings. In 2005, he qualified for the National Finals Rodeo (NFR) for the first time. He then qualified for the NFR from 2006 to 2008, 2010, 2011 and 2015.

In 2007, Silcox won the 2007 PRCA bull riding world championship. He also won the NFR Average Champion title that year. His total was 596 with 7 head out of 10.

He qualified in 2008, and then missed qualifying in 2009 by a small amount. Then he qualified for 2010 and 2011. Then he had a long stretch, not making it back again until 2015, and for the final time. In October, he competed at the Justin Boots Playoffs in Omaha, Nebraska, where he dislocated his shoulder. The Justin Sportsmedicine Team treated him on the spot. For last couple months, he had spent his time rehabbing and preparing for the NFR at the beginning of December. He entered the NFR in fourth place. Under his belt were six rodeo wins and two co-championships. His regular season earnings were $105,000, and he was expected to do well, taking into account his history at every past NFR. However, this was not his year. Although he won Rounds 5 and 10 and placed in Round 9, he suffered a concussion in Round 6. This concussion caused him to miss Rounds 7 and 8.

Silcox qualified for the National Circuit Finals Rodeo (NFCR) three times in 2006, 2011 and 2014. He was also the PRCA Xtreme Bulls Tour champion in 2010 with a total of $37,758. Silcox also competed in the now-defunct Championship Bull Riding (CBR) organization, qualifying for its world finals event seven times from 2005 to 2010, and again in 2013.

Silcox’s final professional bull riding outs were at the PRCA-sanctioned Fort Worth Stock Show & Rodeo in early 2019.

Championships/qualifications 
 7-time CBR World Finals qualifier
 7-time NFR qualifier
 3-time NCFR qualifier
 2007 PRCA World Champion Bull Rider
 2007 NFR Bull Riding Average Champion

Personal life
Silcox married Jerika Sperry on October 15, 2010. They live in Santaquin, Utah, with their son and daughter. He is an avid hunter and sportsman. He has suffered some injuries by the bulls Crossfire Hurricane and Western Rodeo's Dippin' Dots.

References

Sources

Living people
1985 births
Utah Valley University alumni
People from Santaquin, Utah
Bull riders
People from Payson, Utah